Agua Maldita (Unholy Water) is Molotov's seventh album, which was released June 10, 2014. It is the first band's studio album since 2007 release Eternamiente. At the Latin Grammy Awards of 2014, the album won the award for Best Rock Album.

Track list

References

External links 
 Album information on discogs.com

Molotov (band) albums
2014 albums
Universal Music Mexico albums
Latin Grammy Award for Best Rock Album